Thomas Cunningham (born 22 June 1964, Drumchapel, Glasgow) is a Scottish musician, best known as the drummer for Wet Wet Wet.

Biography
Cunningham's father, Tom Sr., bought his son his first drum kit in 1977, "down the Social Club for £15". Shortly thereafter, a chance meeting with Graeme Clark on the school bus brought the two together. Over the next few years the two recruited fellow school friends Mark McLachlan and Neil Mitchell and concentrated on writing their original songs and perfected their song writing craft. From the release of their first single "Wishing I was Lucky", Wet Wet Wet had chart success for a further 10 years.

Cunningham acrimoniously left the band in 1997 after a dispute over royalty payments, and the band went on tour in 1998 without him. At its conclusion, the three remaining members went their separate ways. In 2004, however, they reunited.

Cunningham owned a transport taxi firm in Glasgow but sold it in 2008 to concentrate again on music. He still owns his local Bar, The Village Tavern in Duntocher.

In 2010 Cunningham along with Billy Sloan (DJ journalist) put on a benefit show for their friend Tim Stevens (Tiger Tim, DJ) who suffered from multiple sclerosis and had been forced to quit his job at Radio Clyde due to his illness; on the same bill were Midge Ure, Jim Diamond, Gerard Kelly, Marti Pellow, Paulo Nutini and many more.

Tommy played drums on Jim Diamond’s album "City of Soul" released by Camino Records (catalogue number CAMCD40, release date 3 October 2011). All proceeds from this album of Soul covers benefit the children's charity Radio Clyde Cash For Kids.

Cunningham and the remaining three original members of Wet Wet Wet reformed in 2004 and continue to perform in arena sized venues.

Cunningham is currently presenting a occasional weekend show across the Greatest Hits Radio Scotland network on Saturday afternoons from 3 - 7pm on Clyde 2, Forth 2, MFR 2, Northsound 2, Tay 2 and Westsound.

Personal life
Cunningham is married to his childhood sweetheart Elaine Gallacher. They married in 1991, and have two children: Tayler and Stephen.

References

External links

1964 births
Living people
Musicians from Glasgow
Scottish rock drummers
British male drummers
Wet Wet Wet members
People educated at Clydebank High School